Vance is an unincorporated community in Quitman and Tallahatchie counties, Mississippi.  Vance is located on Mississippi Highway 3 northeast of Tutwiler. Vance has a post office with ZIP code 38964.

Education
The Tallatachie County section is in the West Tallahatchie School District. R. H. Bearden School and West Tallahatchie High School are the local schools.

The Quitman County section is in the Quitman County School District.

Coahoma Community College is the designated community college for Tallahatchie and Quitman counties.

Notable people
Blues musician Sunnyland Slim was born on a farm near Vance.

References

Gallery

Unincorporated communities in Quitman County, Mississippi
Unincorporated communities in Tallahatchie County, Mississippi
Unincorporated communities in Mississippi